HMS Tanatside was a  destroyer of the Royal Navy. She was launched at Yarrow in April 1942. Ships of this class were designed as cheap, easily built vessels for convoy escort and antisubmarine duties. She was named like her sisters after a fox hunt, in her case one in North Wales. War bonds were issued to finance the building of warships. Tanatside was funded by people from Tregaron, Aberaeron, New Quay, Aberystwyth and Teifiside, in a nod to the ship's name. Plaques were presented to each of these townships. During a Warship Week held between 14 and 21 March 1942 the civil community of the Welsh county of Cardiganshire adopted the ship.

Service history
Tanatside took part in Operation Tunnel anti shipping forays and was present at Omaha Beach, where she approached the beach to assist in the destruction of German defences. In December 1945 Tanatside was reduced to care and maintenance at Malta.

Greek service

In 1946 she was transferred to the Greek Navy and renamed Adrias. She was removed from the effective list in 1963 and scrapped in 1964.

References

Publications
 
 English, John (1987). The Hunts: a history of the design, development and careers of the 86 destroyers of this class built for the Royal and Allied Navies during World War II. England: World Ship Society. .

Further reading

External links
 HMS Tanatside at Museum collection 

 

Hunt-class destroyers of the Royal Navy
Ships built on the River Clyde
1942 ships
Hunt-class destroyers of the Hellenic Navy
World War II destroyers of the United Kingdom